= Tommy Mohlin =

Swedish footballer

Personal information
- Date of birth: 25 September 1966 (age 60)
- Position: Defender

Senior career*
Years	Team	Apps	(Gls)
1983–1993	Degerfors IF		
- * Club domestic league appearances and goals

Tommy Mohlin (born 25 September 1966) is a Swedish retired football defender.
